Simon Daniel Horsfall (born 4 March 1976) is a former English cricketer. Horsfall was a left-handed batsman who bowled leg break. He was born in Leeds, Yorkshire.

Horsfall made his debut for Staffordshire in the 1997 Minor Counties Championship against Buckinghamshire. Horsfall played Minor counties cricket for Staffordshire from 1997 to 1998, which included 14 Minor Counties Championship matches and 4 MCCA Knockout Trophy matches. In 1997, he made his List A debut against Nottinghamshire in the NatWest Trophy. He played a further List A match against Leicestershire in the 1998 NatWest Trophy. In his 2 List A matches, he scored 2 runs and took a single wicket at a cost of 43.00, with best figures of 1/28.

References

External links

1976 births
Living people
Cricketers from Leeds
English cricketers
Staffordshire cricketers